The Battle of the Iron Bridge was fought between the Muslim Rashidun army and the Byzantine army in 637 AD. The battle took its name from a nearby nine-arch stone bridge (also known as Jisr al-Hadid) spanning the Orontes River which had gates trimmed with iron. It was one of the last battles fought between the Byzantines and Rashidun Caliphate in the province of Syria. The aftermath of the battle marked the nearly complete annexation of the province into the Rashidun Caliphate with the fall of its capital.

Background
The Rashidun army had achieved a decisive victory at the Battle of Yarmouk. Following this victory, they managed to gain control of the Levant. Jerusalem was conquered shortly afterwards. Rashidun forces then marched north, conquering other portions of the Levant. They penetrated into northern Syria near its borders with Anatolia intending to capture Antioch, and to secure the conquered lands from any possible threat from the north. After the conquest of Aleppo, Abu Ubaidah ibn al-Jarrah sent a column under Malik al-Ashtar to capture Azaz in Northern Syria, east of the Taurus Mountains. The capture and clearance of Azaz was essential to ensure that no large Byzantine forces remained north of Aleppo, from where they could strike at the flank and rear of the Rashidun army during the operation against Antioch. As soon as Malik rejoined the army, Abu Ubaidah marched westwards to capture Antioch, with Khalid ibn Walid leading the advance guard with his Mobile guard. The army marched westward directly from Aleppo via Harim and approached Antioch from the east.

The battle
Twenty kilometers (12 mi) from the city, near modern-day Mahruba, a bridge of iron spanned the River Orontes. It was here that the battle was fought between the Rashidun army and the Byzantine garrison defending Antioch. A major battle was fought, the details of which are not recorded. Khalid ibn Walid played a prominent role with his Mobile guard, as he had done during the Battle of Yarmouk. The Byzantine forces suffered heavy losses and were defeated. The Byzantine casualties in this battle were the third highest in the Muslim conquest of Syria, only exceeded by the battles of Ajnadayn and Yarmouk. The remnants of the defeated Byzantine force fled to Antioch. The Rashidun army later moved up and laid siege to Antioch. The city surrendered on 30 October, 637. According to the pact, the defeated Byzantine soldiers were allowed to depart in peace.

Aftermath
Following the surrender of Antioch, Rashidun army columns moved south along the Mediterranean coast and captured Latakia, Jablah and Tartus (Syria), thus capturing most of north-western Syria. Other columns were sent to subdue the remaining resistance in northern Syria. Khalid ibn Walid was sent with his cavalry on a raid eastwards, up to the Euphrates in the vicinity of Manbij, but found little opposition. The campaign was ended in early January 638. After the defeat of pro-Byzantine Christian Arabs from Al Jazira, who laid the siege of Emessa in March 638, Abu Ubaidah sent more columns under Khalid ibn Walid and Iyad ibn Ghanm to subdue Jazira near the Syrian frontiers and in Anatolia. These columns went northwards as far as the Ararat plain and west towards the Taurus Mountains. The Taurus Mountains in Anatolia thus marked the westernmost frontier of the Rashidun Caliphate in Anatolia.

References

Iron Bridge
Iron Bridge
Iron Bridge
Iron Bridge
637
630s in the Byzantine Empire
Iron Brigde
Iron Bridge
History of Hatay Province
Muslim conquest of the Levant